Eline Gleditsch Brustad (born 25 September 1994) is a Norwegian racing cyclist. She rode at the 2014 UCI Road World Championships.

References

External links

1994 births
Living people
Norwegian female cyclists
Place of birth missing (living people)